The Legend of Johnny Appleseed is an animated short musical segment from Walt Disney's 1948 film Melody Time. It is narrated by Dennis Day and is based on the American frontiersman John Chapman, better known as Johnny Appleseed. It is also included on the 2001 direct to video, VHS, and DVD release Disney's American Legends.

Plot
In 1806, Pittsburgh farmer Johnny Appleseed watches as pioneers depart out west and wishes that he could follow, but doesn't know how to survive in the unknown wild. Johnny is inspired by an angel to abandon his farm, go west, and plant apple seeds everywhere he goes so that settlers will always have something to eat during their travels. The angel tells Johnny that he has all that he needs to go out West: a bag of apple seeds for planting, a holy book known as the Bible, and a tin pot he can use for a hat. In one of his travels, Johnny befriends a skunk, and thereafter, all animals instinctively trust him. As Johnny travels, he uses his pot to fry in, and sings a tune "The Lord Is Good to Me."

In the end, after walking hundreds of miles and planting apple trees all along the way, Johnny finally rests for the last time under a tree; his angel appears before him, and tells Johnny that it's time to go. Johnny's spirit gets up, scared at first upon realizing he's dead and is reluctant to go to his final resting place, believing that his work is not done yet. However, the angel tells him that, where they're headed, they're low on apple trees, so Johnny picks up his seed bag and happily agrees to go with him.

The narrator finishes by saying that he always thinks of Johnny Appleseed whenever he looks up because the clouds in the sky aren't really clouds at all: "they're apple blossoms in Johnny's heavenly orchard."

Songs
 The Lord is Good to Me
 Get on the Wagon Rolling West (Pioneers song)
 There's a Lot of Work To Do
 Apple Feast

Cast
 Dennis Day - Narrator, The Old Settler, Johnny Appleseed, Johnny's Angel
 Dallas McKennon - Additional voices

Uncredited
 Jimmy MacDonald - Additional voices
 The Rhythmaires - Vocals, Additional voices

Theatrical release
The film was originally a sequence in Melody Time, released May 27, 1948, then reissued as a stand-alone short on Christmas of 1955 and later reissued again by Buena Vista Distribution in 1967 as part of Disney's Cartoon Special.

Home media
It was included on the DVD releases of Disney's American Legends, on February 12, 2001; Volume 3 of Walt Disney's It's a Small World of Fun! In February 2007; and Volume 6 of Walt Disney Animation Collection: Classic Short Films on May 12, 2009.

See also
 List of films about angels

Further reading

External links
 

1948 films
1940s biographical films
1940s Disney animated short films
American biographical films
American folklore films and television series
Films directed by Wilfred Jackson
Films produced by Walt Disney
Films scored by Paul Smith (film and television composer)
Films about angels
Films set in the 19th century
Films set in the United States
Films with screenplays by Winston Hibler
Johnny Appleseed
1950s English-language films
1940s English-language films
1950s American films